Liqi Subdistrict is a subdistrict in Hongta District, Yuxi, Yunnan, China. , it has 9 residential communities under its administration.

See also 
 List of township-level divisions of Yunnan

References 

Township-level divisions of Yuxi